Chryseobacterium aquaticum  is a Gram-negative, non-spore-forming and non-motile bacteria from the genus of Chryseobacterium.

References

Further reading

External links
Type strain of Chryseobacterium aquaticum at BacDive -  the Bacterial Diversity Metadatabase

aquaticum
Bacteria described in 2008